Road of Hell (Spanish: Camino del infierno) is a 1951 Mexican thriller film directed by Miguel Morayta and starring Pedro Armendáriz, Leticia Palma and Wolf Ruvinskis.

The film's art direction was by Gunther Gerszo.

Cast
 Pedro Armendáriz as Pedro Uribe  
 Leticia Palma as Leticia  
 Wolf Ruvinskis as Tony  
 Ramón Gay as León  
 Arturo Soto Rangel as Dr. Fausto  
 Manuel Calvo as El Chueco  
 Lupe Inclán as Doña Chole  
 Dora María as Cantante  
 Armando Velasco as Don Fermín  
 Pascual García Peña as Bruno Landeros, esbirro de Pedro  
 Ignacio Villalbazo 
 Guillermo Samperio as Detective de policía  
 Fernando Galiana as Taquillero en cine  
 Edmundo Espino as Jefe de detectives  
 José Chávez as Joselito, esbirro de Pedro  
 Francisco Pando as Juanito, cantinero
 Julio Daneri as Cantinero  
 Kika Meyer as Mujer de la calle  
 Joaquín Roche as Empleado cabaret

References

Bibliography 
 Rogelio Agrasánchez. Carteles de la época de oro del cine mexicano. Archivo Fílmico Agrasánchez, 1997.

External links 
 

1951 films
1950s thriller films
Mexican thriller films
1950s Spanish-language films
Films directed by Miguel Morayta
Mexican black-and-white films
1950s Mexican films